The 21st Fangoria Chainsaw Awards is an award ceremony presented for horror films that were released in 2018. The nominees were announced in January 2019. The film Hereditary won five of its seven nominations, including Best Wide Release, as well as the write-in poll of Best Kill.

Winners and nominees

References

Fangoria Chainsaw Awards
Fangoria
Fangoria